Neighborhoods is the only studio album from American musician Ernest Hood, self-released in 1975. It is a work of ambient music that explores the soundscapes of Portland, Oregon suburbia through a collage of field recordings layered with Hood's zither and synthesizer melodies. Only one thousand copies were pressed during its original production run. After remaining in obscurity for over 40 years, it was reissued by Freedom to Spend in 2019.

Background
Ernest Hood was born in 1923. He was a jazz guitarist in the Portland, Oregon area in the 1940s. He played with his brother Bill and saxophonist Charlie Barnet. Hood contracted polio in the 1950s, which confined him to using a wheelchair for the rest of his life. As he could no longer hold a guitar, he started playing the zither. He played zither on some of Flora Purim's early albums.

Production
The album was largely composed with zithers and the Roland SH-3A synthesizer.

Track listing

Personnel
 Ernest Hood – Zithers, keyboards, sounds 
 Russ Gorsline – Mixing

References

External links

1975 albums
Music of Portland, Oregon
Ambient albums by American artists
Experimental music albums by American artists
Field recording